Claudiu Emil Bunea (born 28 December 1981) is a Romanian former footballer who played as a midfielder for teams such as: Gaz Metan Mediaș, CSU Voința Sibiu or ASA 2013 Târgu Mureș, among others.

External links

1981 births
Living people
People from Mediaș
Romanian footballers
Association football midfielders
Liga I players
Liga II players
CSM Deva players
CS Gaz Metan Mediaș players
CSU Voința Sibiu players
ASA 2013 Târgu Mureș players